Screamer is the sixth studio album by the American alternative rock band Third Eye Blind. It was released on October 18, 2019 by Mega Collider Records.

Background 
Frontman Stephan Jenkins had made many different comments about the prospect of the band recording a sixth studio album prior to the release of Screamer. As far back as 2012, Jenkins stated that the band would not ever make a sixth studio album, stating that after the release of their fifth studio album, 2015's Dopamine, they would cease recording full albums in favor of touring and recording smaller EP releases. In the coming years, the band would focus on EP releases, including We Are Drugs in 2016, a cancelled EP entitled Summer Gods that was supposed to explore trap music in 2017, and an EP of cover songs, Thanks for Everything, in 2018. Jenkins' stance on recording an album wavered at times in this era, sometimes referring to Summer Gods as an album and explaining that the recording of Thanks for Everything was to find inspiration for recording a future studio album.

As late as November 2018, Jenkins was still referring to the release as an EP, though by May 2019, Jenkins announced it had grown from an EP to a full 10-song studio album. In July 2019, Jenkins announced that it had expanded into an 11-song album titled Screamer, scheduled for release on October 18, 2019.

Writing and recording
Jenkins noted that the album features far more outside collaborations than prior Third Eye Blind albums, with the band adopting an "open door policy" for various artists to contribute ideas to songs. Billy Corgan of Smashing Pumpkins was described as the album's "musical consigliere" (advisor). Jenkins began communicating with Corgan in 2017 after hearing him say on MTV that Third Eye Blind was one of his favorite bands. Jenkins played some song ideas to Corgan, who helped shape some songs. Corgan co-wrote the track "Light It Up" and helped Jenkins with the track "Who Am I".

The album's title track features Alexis Krauss of Sleigh Bells, "Who Am I" contains a contribution from Ryan Olson of Marijuana Deathsquads, and "Got So High" features a contribution from Poliça. Jenkins stated the album's sound deviated from the sound of prior albums as well, aiming for a rougher, less polished sound and emphasizing a mantra of "Keep the edge, keep it weird". Thematically, the album explores the idea of personal revelation and passion in the face of an oncoming dystopia, being inspired by social and political activism of recent years.

Release and promotion
The album was initially planned to be released prior to the band's North American tour with Jimmy Eat World in June 2019, but the album was stuck at only 90% complete at the time and was held back. While the band was unable to promote the album itself on the tour, they still teased the album's upcoming release at live shows and debuted new songs live at various shows, including "Screamer", "The Kids Are Coming", and "Ways". The studio recording of "Screamer" was released on July 25, 2019, the same day as the album's name and release date announcement. The album was one of ten grouped together in the "Ten Albums, One Cause" breast cancer awareness campaign, which involved it receiving a special pink vinyl release.

A music video for the fourth single "Ways" was released on April 22, 2020, featuring skater and transgender icon Cher Strauberry.

Track listing

Personnel
Credits are adapted from the liner notes of Screamer.

Third Eye Blind
 Stephan Jenkins – vocals
 Brad Hargreaves – drums
 Kryz Reid – guitar, backing vocals
 Alex LeCavalier – bass, backing vocals
 Colin CreeV – keys, guitar, backing vocals

Other musicians
 Charith Premawardhana – viola
 Kris Donegan – guitars
 Alex Kopp – keys
 Chad Copelin – keys guitar
 Ryan Olson – keys, beats

Technical
 Mitch Allan – vocal production
 Charles Godfrey – engineering
 Chris Gehringer – mastering
 Chad Copelin – additional engineering
 Bryce Goggin – additional engineering
 Ari Rios – additional engineering
 Sean Beresford – additional engineering
 Ryan Olson – arrangement
 Curtis Peoples – vocal arrangement
 Billy Corgan – song arrangement

Design
 Daniel Nolan – front and back cover photo/design, additional photos
 Douglas Heusser – album layout
 Ryan Olson – Screamer concept
 Stephan Jenkins – Screamer concept
 Stephen Albanese – additional photos
 Michael Wilson – additional photos

References

2019 albums
Third Eye Blind albums